Salih Güney (born January 1, 1945) is a Turkish film actor.

Biography
Salih Güney was born in Adana in 1945. His father was a Circassian. Güney graduated in theatre from the republican conservatory of Ankara. He made his film debut in Haldun Dormen's Bozuk Düzen. He has gone on to act in over 150 films and series.

He started acting professionally on stage and in movies when he was only 19 years old. He is considered the 'James Dean' of Turkey, a rebellious and attractive star of the Turkish movies. In 1969, at age 25, he stopped acting on stage, not because he wanted to, but because the producers said that with all his work on the stage, he would not get a great part in movies.

In that same year, he starred in the 1970 Columbia Pictures movie, You Can't Win 'Em All with Tony Curtis, Charles Bronson and Michèle Mercier. After this production he went to Sweden and England to develop his skills behind the camera. He moved to the United States and became a US citizen.

He now lives in Europe and still appears on TV regularly. Besides acting, he avidly pursues his hobby of archeology. He strongly supports the idea that archeological artifacts from Turkey stay in Turkey and fought for bringing back the stolen sculpture of Heracles, which appeared in a private collection in the USA.

He has two daughters.

Filmography
 Bu kalp seni unutur mu (2010)
 Kül ve Ateş (2009)
 Beyza'nin kadinları (2006) .... Police Chief ... a.k.a. Shattered Soul (International: English title)
 Belalı baldız (2005)
 "Dönme dolap" (2004) TV mini-series
 "Serseri aşıklar" (2003) TV mini-series .... Ekrem
 "Kardelen" (2002) TV mini-series ... a.k.a. The Snowdrop (International: English title)
 "Kaldirim cicegi" (1996) TV series
 Afrodit (1987) .... Murat
 Çelik mezar (1983)
 Haram (1983)
 Ask dedigin laftir (1977)
 Hasan almaz basan alir (1975)
 Kahramanlar (1975)
 Arap abdo (1974)
 "Ask-i memnu" (1974) TV mini-series .... Behlül ... a.k.a. The Forbidden Love (International: English title)
 Ask mahkumu (1973) .... Kenan
 Ah koca dünya (1972)
 Aci pirinç (1972)
 Asi Gençler (1972) .... Yücel
 Benimle sevisir misin? (1972) .... Erol
 Dinmeyen sizi (1972)
 Kanun adami (1972)
 Suya düsen hayal (1972)
 Altin prens devler ülkesinde (1971) .... Altin prens ... a.k.a. The Golden Prince in the Land of the Giants (International: English title)
 Ask hikayesi (1971) .... Taner
 Binbir gece masallari (1971) ... a.k.a. The 1001 Nights (International: English title)
 Bir genc kizin romani (1971)
 Iki ruhlu kadin (1971) .... Orhan
 Korkusuz Kaptan Swing (1971) .... Kaptan Swing ... a.k.a. Courageous Captain Swing (USA: literal English title)
 Saraylar melegi (1971)
 Seks firtinasi (1971)
 Yedi kocali Hürmüz (1971)
 You Can't Win 'Em All (1970) .... Capt. Enver ... a.k.a. Soldiers of Fortune (USA: video title) ... a.k.a. The Dubious Patriots
 Asktan da üstün (1970) .... Turgut
 Ah Müjgan ah (1970)
 Aysecik - Sana tapiyorum (1970) ... a.k.a. I Adore You (UK: literal English title)
 Birlesen yollar (1970) ... a.k.a. Crossroads (International: English title)
 Ceylan Emine (1970)
 Firari asiklar (1970)
 Güller ve dikenler (1970)
 Ölünceye kadar (1970) .... Ihsan
 Pamuk Prenses ve 7 cüceler (1970) .... The prince ... a.k.a. Pamuk Prenses ve Yedi Cüceler ... a.k.a. Snow White and the Seven Dwarfs
 Talihsiz baba (1970)
 Iki yetime (1969)
 Misir'dan gelen gelin (1969)
 Ölümsüzler (1969)
 Sevgili babam (1969)
 Tatli sevgilim (1969)
 Aglayan bir ömür (1968)
 Ask eski bir yalan (1968)
 Funda (1968)
 Karanlik yollar (1968)
 Aglayan kadin (1967) ... a.k.a. The Crying Woman (International: English title)
 Bir söförün gizli defteri (1967) ... a.k.a. Secret Diary of a Taxi Driver (International: English title)
 Çildirtan arzu (1967)
 Efenin intikami (1967)
 Hirçin kadin (1967)
 Imamin gazabi (1967)
 Mühür gözlüm (1967)
 Nemli gözler (1967)
 Söyleyin genç kizlara (1967)
 Utanç kapilari (1967)
 Zalimler de sever (1967)
 O kadin (1966)
 Bozuk düzen (1966)
 Çilgin gençlik (1966)
 Çitkirildim (1966) .... Ergun
 Dört kursun (1966)
 Fedailer (1966)
 Garibim çalikusu (1966)
 Günah çocugu (1966)
 Ibrahim Ethem ilahi davet (1966)
 Intikam firtinasi (1966)
 Kanunsuz daglar (1966)
 Karacaoglan (1966) .... Karacaoglan
 Yigitler ölmezmis (1966)
 Kelepçeli bilekler (1965)
 Korkusuz yasayanlar (1965)
 Sehvetin esiriyiz (1965)
 Yasak sokaklar (1965) ... a.k.a. The Forbidden Streets (International: English title)
 Yildiz tepe (1965)

References

 Turksinemasi.com - Biography of Salih Güney
 Sinematurk.com - Filmography of Salih Güney

External links

1945 births
People from Adana
Living people
Turkish male film actors
Turkish people of Circassian descent
Golden Orange Life Achievement Award winners